List of drawings by Vincent van Gogh is an incomplete collection of drawings by the Dutch artist Vincent van Gogh (1853–1890) that form an important part of his complete body of work. The listing is ordered by year and then by catalogue number. While more accurate dating of Van Gogh's work is often difficult. As a general rule the numbering from Jan Hulsker's catalogue is more precise chronologically

Drawings

London-Belgium-Etten

The Hague-Drenthe

Nuenen-Antwerp

Paris

Auvers-sur-Oise

See also
Articles that include drawings, water-colours or prints:
 Early works of Vincent van Gogh
 Flowering Orchards (Van Gogh series)
 Hospital in Arles (Van Gogh series)
 Langlois Bridge at Arles (Van Gogh series)
 Portrait of Dr. Gachet
 Saintes-Maries (Van Gogh series)
 Yellow House (painting)
 The Zouave

Resources
Due to the considerable number of works on paper by Van Gogh, for a valid identification reference is to the numbers of Jacob Baart de la Faille's Catalogue raisonné (1928 & 1970) (F) or to Jan Hulsker's updated compilation (1978, revised 1989) (JH).

References

Notes

Literature
Vincent van Gogh: Drawings, ed. Johannes van der Wolk, Ronald Pickvance & E. B. F. Pey, Arnoldo Mondadori Arte & De Luca Edizione d'Arte 1990 (editions in various languages:  (Dutch))
Vincent van Gogh: The Drawings, ed. Colta Ives, Susan Alyson Stein etc., The Metropolitan Museum of Art, New York & Yale University Press, New Haven and London, 2005

External links
The Globe and Mail, "Long Lost Sketchbook Found"
Van Gogh, paintings and drawings: a special loan exhibition, a fully digitized exhibition catalog from The Metropolitan Museum of Art Libraries

.
Paintings of Paris by Vincent van Gogh
Paintings of Arles by Vincent van Gogh
Paintings of Saint-Rémy-de-Provence by Vincent van Gogh
Paintings of Auvers-sur-Oise by Vincent van Gogh
van Gogh
van Gogh
van Gogh
van Gogh
Collections of the Thyssen-Bornemisza Museum